Mendoza PM-1 is a series of handguns that includes two models of pistols manufactured in Mexico by Productos Mendoza: The MXIK (pronounced as "meh-shee-kah") in .380 ACP caliber and the AZTK (pronounced as "az-teh-kah") in 9mm caliber.

Design and development 
Productos Mendoza began working on the design of this weapon in 2014, seeking to create a light and high-strength handgun. Its first physical appearances began in 2018 in different exhibitions, the following year being in which it would begin its sale to the public.

The handle is made of polymer with interchangeable handle covers according to the size of the user's hand, it also has an ambidextrous safety lever, manual slide stop and laser sight rail. It has a metal slide, which, like the bolt and barrel of the weapon, is subjected to Tenifer QPQ treatment, which improves its surface hardness and resistance to oxidation and corrosion, also allowing a less gloss finish to avoid discomfort seeing when shooting.

Additionally, the weapon has a supply "witness" bolt on the slide, which rises when there is a cartridge in the chamber. It also has a fall arrester on the firing needle to prevent accidental firing.

It has a "dovetail" type fixed rear sight with white lines, likewise, the front sight is also fixed with a white dot. The 9 mm Parabellum version called AZTK has an 18-round magazine plus 1 in the chamber, while the .380 ACP version called MXIK has a 19-round magazine plus one in the chamber. both versions have a 4-rifling barrel.

References

External links 
Productos Mendoza
SEDENA

Semi-automatic pistols
Semi-automatic pistols of Mexico
.380 ACP firearms
9mm Parabellum firearms